Activity vector analysis (AVA) is a psychometric questionnaire designed to measure four personality factors or vectors: aggressiveness, sociability, emotional control and social adaptability. It is used as an employment test.

The AVA was developed by the psychologist Walter V. Clarke in 1942, based on work by Prescott Lecky, William Marston and others.

See also
 DISC assessment
 List of personality tests
 Myers-Briggs Type Indicator

References

External links
Personality Test: The Bridge Personality
Online Personality Tests & Psychometric Profiling

Personality tests
Personality typologies